Piddubny Olympic College is a sports school in Kyiv that provides sports reserve for Olympic sports. The college also has a combined boarding middle and high school. Upon successful completion a college graduate of the school receives an undergraduate diploma in "Physical development and sport".

History
The college was created in 1966 by the Cabinet of Ministers of Ukraine as the Republican College of Physical Culture (Respublikanske vyshche uchylyshche fizychnoyi kultury) also known as RVUFK. On 24 July 2015 it was renamed to Piddubny Olympic College. The college has two specialized halls for fencing, small sports halls for light athletics and football, a swimming pool, five football fields, a specialized hall for sports gymnastics, a specialized hall for wrestling, five indoor tennis courts. There are also two dormitory buildings, two dining halls, main learning building, medical department, library, computer room, laundry room, auto parking, and warehouses.

Sections:

RVUFK is a member of the Kyiv City Football Federation, a regional federation of the Football Federation of Ukraine. Its football team participates in championships of both Kyiv City and Kyiv Oblast football federations.

At the 2015 Makarov Memorial Tournament, the college football team participated under the name of CSKA Kyiv.

Notable alumni

 Yury Gelman (born 1955), Ukrainian-born American Olympic fencing coach

See also
 National University of Physical Education and Sport of Ukraine
 Ivan Piddubny, Ukrainian athlete of the Russian Empire and the Soviet Union
 FC CSKA Kyiv

References

External links
 Official website
 RVUFK squad for the 2016 Kyiv Oblast championship. Kyiv Oblast Football Federation website

 
Sport schools in Ukraine
University and college football clubs in Ukraine